The following is a timeline of the history of the city of Vilnius, Lithuania.

Prior to 17th century

 1323
 Gediminas relocates Lithuanian capital to Vilnius from Trakai.
 Castle on Gediminas Hill expanded.
 1330 – Coat of arms of Vilnius granted.
 1345 – Pyatnitzkaya Church built.
 1348 – Cathedral of the Theotokos built.
 1387
 Magdeburg rights granted.
 St. Nicholas Church built.
 1397 – Cathedral School active (approximate date).
 1409 – Gediminas' Tower built.
 1426 – Church of St. John built.
 1469 – Church of Saints Bernard and Francis founded.
 1500 – St. Anne's Church consecrated.
 1522
 City walls and Gate of Dawn built.
 Francysk Skaryna sets up printing press.
 1555 – Lutheran Church built on Nyemetzkaya Street.
 1557 – Vilnius Cathedral rebuilt.
 1560 – St. Paraskeva Church rebuilt.
 1570 – Jesuit library established.
 1572 – Synagogue built.
 1579 – Alma Academia et Universitas Vilnensis Societatis Iesu founded.
 1588 – Plague.
 1597 – Monastery of the Holy Ghost founded.

17th-18th centuries
 1610 – Fire.
 1626 – Church of St. Theresa founded.
 1630 – All Saints Church built.
 1633 – Great Synagogue built.
 1644 – Biblioteca Sapehana willed to Vilnia University.
 1653 – Radziwill Palace built.
 1655 – July: Battle of Vilnius; Russians in power.
 1656 – Town becomes part of Russia.
 1658 – Battle of Werki.
 1697 – Sapieha Palace built.
 1701 – St. Peter and St. Paul's Church built.
 1702 – Swedes in power.
 1710 – Plague.
 1739 – Green Bridge constructed.
 1749 – Divine Mercy Sanctuary built.
 1781 – University Botanical Garden established.
 1788 – Russians in power.
 1794 – Vilnius Uprising.
 1795
 Town becomes part of Russia, and capital of Vilna Governorate.
 St. Paraskeva Church rebuilt.
 1799
 Town Hall rebuilt.
 Romm publishing house relocates to Vilnius.

19th century

 1801
 Rasos Cemetery consecrated.
 Royal Palace demolished.
 1809 – Antakalnis Cemetery established.
 1810 – Bernardine Cemetery established.
 1812
 Napoleon uses the city as a military base.
 Vilnian National Guard formed.
 1823 – Population: 20,900.
 1825 – Tuskulenai Manor built.
 1828 – Jewish cemetery established in Uzupis (approximate date).
 1831 – Uprising.
 1832 – University closed.
 1834 – Presidential Palace renovated.
 1836 – St. George Avenue laid out.
 1845 – Theatre opens.
 1852 – Central Archive of Early Register Books established.
 1855 – Museum of Antiquities established.
 1856 – Public library established.
 1861 – Demonstration against Russian Empire.
 1863 – Uprising against Russian Empire.
 1866 – St. Nicholas Orthodox Church reconsecrated.
 1867 – Pretchistenski Cathedral rebuilt.
 1881 – Population: 89,560.
 1883 – Population: 93,760.
 1897 – Jewish Labor Bund founded in Vilnius.
 1898 – St. Alexander Nevsky Church and District Court built.
 1900 – Population: 162,633.

20th century

 1901 – Kaziukas Fair relocates to Place Lukiskim.
 1903 – Power Plant, Choral Synagogue and Our Lady of the Sign Church built.
 1904 – Lukiškės Prison built.
 1905 – December: Great Seimas of Vilnius held.
 1906
 Society of Friends of Science organized.
 Vileišis Palace built.
 1907 – Lithuanian Art Society founded.
 1911 – St. Casimir Church, Naujoji Vilnia built.
 1913
 Orthodox Church of St. Michael and St. Constantine built.
 Population: 204,290.
 1915
 19 September: Germans in power.
 City becomes capital of Lithuania District.
 1916 – Vilna Troupe active.
 1918
 16 February: Lithuania declares independence from German Empire.
 Museum of History and Ethnography established.
 1919
 April: Vilna offensive by Polish army.
 Central Library of Lithuania organized.
 Jabłkowski Brothers department store opens.
 1920 – October: Żeligowski's Mutiny.
 1925
 Darius Stadium opens.
 Elektrit Radiotechnical Society, Roman Catholic Metropolitan Archdiocese of Vilnius, and Yiddish Scientific Institute established.
 6 May: School massacre.
 1926 – City becomes capital of Wilno Voivodeship.
 1928 – Northern Trade Fair begins.
 1931 – Population: 195,000.
 1933
 City Museum established.
 Śmigły Wilno soccer team formed.
 1939
 Soviets in power.
 Vilnius Pedagogical Institute established.
 1940
 City becomes capital of Lithuanian Soviet Socialist Republic.
 Vilnius State Theatre established.
 1941
 June: Germans in power.
 July: Ponary massacre begins.
 1942 – Fareynikte Partizaner Organizatsye formed in Vilna Jewish Ghetto.
 1943 – HKP 562 forced labor camp set up by Germans.
 1944
 6–15 July: Operation Ostra Brama; Soviets in power.
 Airport begins operating.
 1945 – Music School founded.
 1946 – Russian Drama Theatre re-established.{ref></ref>
 1950 – Žalgiris Stadium opens.
 1951 – Vilnius Heat Plant commissioned.
 1955 – Šeškinė village becomes part of the city.
 1956
 Trolleybuses begin operating.
 Vilnius Gediminas Technical University established.
 1963
 National Library of Lithuania relocates to Vilnius.
 Polish Theater founded.
 1964 – Statyba basketball team formed.
 1965
 Žirmūnai Bridge constructed.
 Vingis Park renovated.
 Population: 293,000.
 1967 – Technika (publisher) established.
 1968 – Ratilio ensemble formed.
 1971 – Palace of Concerts and Sports opens.
 1972 – Valakampiai Bridge constructed.
 1974
 Lithuanian National Opera and Ballet Theatre built.
 Evangelical Cemetery demolished.
 1979 – Population: 503,000.
 1980 – Seimas Palace and Vilnius TV Tower built.
 1983 – Vilnius Combined Heat and Power Plant commissioned.
 1985 – Population: 544,000.
 1987 – Vilnius Jazz Festival begins.
 1989 – Jewish State Museum established.
 1990
 11 March: Lithuania declares independence from USSR.
 Vilnius Lyceum and Vilniaus lietuvių namai (school) established.
 1991 – January: City besieged by Soviet forces.
 1992
 Genocide and Resistance Research Centre of Lithuania and Verkiai Regional Park established.
 Museum of Genocide Victims opens.
 1994 – Military Academy of Lithuania established.
 1995 – Alis Vidūnas becomes mayor.
 1997
 1 April: Užupis neighborhood declares itself an independent republic.
 Rolandas Paksas becomes mayor.
 Kalnai Park established.
 1999
 Vilnius Book Fair begins.
 Juozas Imbrasas becomes mayor.
 2000
 House of the Signatories museum opens.
 Artūras Zuokas becomes mayor.

21st century

 2001 – Sportima Arena opens.
 2002
 Vilnius Ice Palace opens.
 Energy and Technology Museum established.
 2003
 Mindaugas Bridge opens.
 750th anniversary of the coronation of Mindaugas.
 FK Vetra relocates to Vilnius.
 2004
 Siemens Arena and Vetra Stadium open.
 European Humanities University relocates to Vilnius.
 Europa Tower built.
 Mykolas Romeris University and Vilnius Academy of Business Law established.
 Vilnius Marathon begins.
 2005 – Lietuvos rytas Arena opens.
 2006 – May: City hosts regional democracy conference.
 2007
 Juozas Imbrasas becomes mayor again.
 Jonas Mekas Visual Arts Center opens.
 2008
 February: City hosts NATO meeting.
 Vilnius Airport railway station opens.
 Gariunai Market pavilion built.
 2009
 Palace of the Grand Dukes of Lithuania rebuilt.
 City designated a European Capital of Culture.
 2011
 Vilniaus viesasis transportas (bus company) established.
 Population: 554,060.
 Artūras Zuokas becomes mayor again.
 2015 – Remigijus Šimašius becomes mayor.

See also
 History of Vilnius
 List of mayors of Vilnius
 Neighborhoods of Vilnius

References

This article incorporates information from the Lithuanian Wikipedia, Polish Wikipedia, and Russian Wikipedia.

Bibliography

External links

 
Vilnius
Years in Lithuania
Vilnius